Batata may refer to:

Related to sweet potato (Ipomoea batatas) 
 Batata, the word for sweet potato in many languages, including Hebrew & Spanish

 Elsinoë batatas (sweet potato scab), a plant pathogen
 Fusarium oxysporum f.sp. batatas, a plant pathogen
 Phyllosticta batatas, a plant pathogen

Related to potato (Solanum tuberosum) 
 Batata, the word for potato in some variants of Arabic and some Indian languages, including Gujarati, Konkani and Marathi, and Portuguese
 Batata harra, a Lebanese vegetable dish
 Batata vada, an Indian snack from the state of Maharashtra
 , a type of French fry in Portugal

Other uses 
 Cayo Batata, an island in Puerto Rico
 Nílton Batata (real name Nílton Pinheiro da Silva), a Brazilian football player
 Roberto Batata (real name Roberto Monteiro, 1949–1976), Brazilian football player
 Batata (footballer) (born 2000), Brazilian football player
 Batatá, a regional variant of the name Boi-tatá, a monster from Brazilian indigenous folklore
 Idea Cellular, named after its parent firms
 Batata (film), a 2022 Canadian-Lebanese documentary film